Skull & Keys is a men's honor society at the University of California, Berkeley. The organization was started by Theta Nu Epsilon. Much of the society's practices, members, and traditions are kept secret. Skull & Keys is the first of several collegiate secret societies to have originated from the fraternity system at Berkeley, the others being the Sigma Phi Society of the Thorsen House and Sons and Daughters of California.

History
Skull & Keys was founded in 1892 by, among others, the novelist Frank Norris. Skull & Keys was founded as an upperclassman society for members of Theta Nu Epsilon, with many of its early members having affiliations with societies from Yale. The society intended to hold "Tap Day" ceremonies at Berkeley, in following the traditions of Yale as well. The Zeta or Berkeley chapter of Theta Nu Epsilon was founded as a Sophomore society at Berkeley eleven years before in 1881. Skull & Keys membership was initially drawn from Senior and Junior classes at the university.

Historically, it meets semi-monthly in a facility known only as the Tomb. It is led by the Uncle, who is elected by voice vote of the active members. Invitees endure the initiation ritual known as the Running.

Members

 Frank Norris
 William Horsley Orrick, Sr.of Orrick, Herrington & Sutcliffe

External links
 Skull & Keys initiation at University of California
Skull and Keys History (PDF)

References

Honor societies
Student organizations established in 1892
Collegiate secret societies
University of California, Berkeley
1892 establishments in California